Toyota Stadium may refer to:
Toyota Stadium (Georgetown, Kentucky), home stadium of Georgetown College, United States
Toyota Stadium (Japan), an open-roof association football stadium in Toyota, Japan
Toyota Stadium (South Africa), rugby stadium in Bloemfontein, South Africa
Toyota Stadium (Texas), home stadium of FC Dallas of Major League Soccer in Frisco, Texas, United States
Endeavour Field (formerly known as Toyota Stadium), the home stadium of the Cronulla-Sutherland Sharks of the National Rugby League in Australia
West Community Stadium, formerly Toyota Stadium, home stadium of Saint Louis FC of the United Soccer League Championship (2015–2020)

See also
Toyota Field, home stadium of San Antonio FC of the United Soccer League, United States
Toyota Field (Madison, Alabama), home stadium of the Rocket City Trash Pandas, a Minor League Baseball team in the Southern League
 Toyota Center (disambiguation)
 Toyota Park (disambiguation)
 Toyota Arena (disambiguation)
 Toyota (disambiguation)